The Marina Ground is a sports ground in Gouvia on the island of Corfu, Greece. In October 2019, it was selected to host the 2019 Hellenic Premier League, which was a  Twenty20 International (T20I) tri-series between Greece, Serbia and Bulgaria.

Twenty 20 International centuries

The following table summarises the Twenty 20 International centuries scored at the venue.

See also
 Greece national cricket team

External links
Cricinfo Profile

References

Sport in Greece